Paulding County is the name of two counties in the United States of America:

 Paulding County, Georgia
 Paulding County, Ohio